Mark Knowles and Daniel Nestor were the defending champions, but lost in the second round this year.

Jonas Björkman and Patrick Rafter won the title, defeating Todd Martin and Richey Reneberg 6–4, 7–6 in the final.

Seeds

Draw

Finals

Top half

Bottom half

Qualifying

Seeds

Qualifiers

Qualifying draw

First qualifier

Second qualifier

References
 Official results archive (ATP)
 Official results archive (ITF)

1998 ATP Tour
1998 Newsweek Champions Cup and the State Farm Evert Cup